Mohamed Omar Salihi, was a marine scientist, engineer, and maritime advisor to the Somali presidency credited for the protection of Somalia's maritime database during the civil war that broke in 1991, a statement by the presidency, Farmajo has described the late academic as a "backbone of the Somalia-Kenya maritime case at ICJ" and serving his country tirelessly and faithfully, He played a key role in documentation, mapping among other tasks during the Somalia -Kenya maritime case which began in 2014 and concluded in March 2021, He spoke English, Italian, Polish, Arabic and Russian

Biography 
Mohamed Omar Salihi was born on 1952 in Luuq, Somalia, His father worked for the local administration in Luuq where he also went to primary school between the years 1958 and 1964, In 1965 He enrolled at middle school in Baidoa, Bay province where he graduated in 1968. Mohamed later moved to the capital Mogadishu for his secondary school education in Banadir Secondary School in Mogadishu, where he did exceptionally well, so exemplarily that he was among the  top 5 best students nationally in Somalia, This qualified him to a scholarship to study in Poland, He completed his undergraduate & postgraduate education at Warsaw Polytechnical University, Faculty of Geodesy in Warsaw from 1973 to 1979 and left for home to give back to Somalia.

Career 
Mohamed Omar Ibrahim Salihi upon his return to Somalia undertook the Bay Project which modernized Baidoa into a major Somali city with modern architecture and social amenities, This was under a developmental project by the USAID, Moving on from tenuous work to another he would later find himself working for the Directive of Surveys and Maps at the Ministry of Defense where he served as a soldier and simultaneously attained the rank of colonel in the Somali National Army due his added advantage of skilled higher educational level, The cartographic maps he helped develop in the Ministry would later help clear a lot of border issues and provincial lines and can still be found at the Somali Foreign Affairs Ministry.

Between 1983 and 1987 Engineer Saalihi would aid in surveying of lands and building of landmarks like The National Museum, Ministry of Defense owned farms and construction of water canals, He was also the Director General in the Irrigation Directive of Lower Shabelle from 1987 to 1990, The Military Government also appointed him to a special committee to demarcate the invisible and unofficial “borderline” between Somali and Ethiopia, He later helped facilitate humanitarian works under UNSOM and UNOPS in Gedo province during the tough period following the destructive civil war, Under the tedious Transitional National Government of president Abdiqassim he was deputy Minister for Agriculture

He later went to Dar Es Salam, Tanzania to study remote sensing and satellite photos to gather sensory data. He also worked for a British company-Done International where he was contracted for ten years to undertake Coastal Management. Engineer understood the power of always self-developing as an individual, taking any and every opportunity to further his educational level and skillset. The late engineer was also a polyglot who spoke a wide range of languages that were Somali, English, Arabic, Italian and Polish

He spent the last years of his life doing what he did best that was his lifelong quest; he was an integral part of the Somali delegation to the International Court of Justice on Maritime Delimitation in the Indian Ocean. Somalia has been in conflict with Kenya over Kenya's claim of Somali territorial waters that saw Somalia seek legal redress at the International Court of Justice. President Hassan Sheikh Mohamud who appointed him as his advisor on maritime affairs, an advisory role that would still be under the following administration of president Mohamed Abdullahi Farmaajo. His topographical knowledge coupled with his mastery and cache of supporting documents strengthened Somalia's case at the International Court of Justice. He gave the much needed technical knowledge and nuances to the Somali delegation due to his years in the maritime field; his expert advice was instrumental to the case from the start since some of them had no idea where to begin.  Kenya has delayed the case for a record 4 times and was a no show the last hearing at The Hague, the courts sitting. Engineer Salihi accompanied the Somali delegation in March 2021 headed by the deputy Prime Minister Mahdi Gullaid and said the following powerful prayer; “May Allah keep me alive to witness the court’s decision on the maritime case I put so much into it” sadly it wasn't to be. President Farmaajo led the nation in the final Janaza prayers for the national treasure; it was attended by the Prime Minister, Deputy Prime Minister and Minister for Religious Affairs among other top ranking leaders and Somalis from all walks of life. Somalia truly lost a figure that leaves a gap too hard to be filled.

References

1952 births
2021 deaths
Oceanographers
Somalian engineers
Somalian scientists
People from Gedo